Rashk-e Olya (also Romanized as Rashk-e ‘Olyā and Rashk ‘Olyā; also known as Rashk, Rashk-e Bālā, Rask-e Bālā, and Rask-i-Du) is a village in Toghrol Al Jerd Rural District, Toghrol Al Jerd District, Kuhbanan County, Kerman Province, Iran. At the 2006 census, its population was 176, in 59 families.

References 

Populated places in Kuhbanan County